Leigh Ryan, better known by the stage name Plutonic Lab or sometimes as Pluto is an Australian music producer, engineer, artist & performer.

He is also one half of soul/pop duo “SoundsLike FRANCO” with vocalist Natalie Slade, one third of Canadian/Australian rap group “SHWING” with BBRC members Roshin & Bronze as well as the international tour drummer for the group Hilltop Hoods.

Pluto has collaborated with Ladi6 (NZ), Black Milk (US), G-Love (US), Guilty Simpson (US), Wiley (UK) Miles Bonny (US), Natalie Slade (AU), Notes To Self BBRC (Canada), Coma-Chi (Japan) Renee Geyer (AU), Drapht (AU), Hilltop Hoods (AU), Dialectrix (AU), Speech Debelle (UK), Task Force (UK), Fat Lip (US), Eternia (Canada), The Grouch & Eligh (US).

Early life and career

Plutonic Lab began drumming at the age of 10 and performing shows at 14. He obtained an honours degree in Sound Design/Media Arts from RMIT University, studying under Australian film composer/artist Philip Brophy and sound artist Phillip Samartzis.

In 1995 he produced the album "Mystery Shkool" for his group Macronauts on CD and Cassette & two beat tapes, Tri Chromes and M.O.S., in 1998 under his own label, Plutonic Lovely. In 2001, he released his first solo album, Give Me Sabotage Shell, followed by Collision of Days in 2004, both released on Nuff Said Records. His third solo album, Codes Over Colours, was released in 2005 on Obese Records. Taking 10 years between solo albums his last LP "Deep Above The Noise" won best Hip-Hop Album at the VIC Music Awards 2016. Attaining feature album status on Double J & 3PBS and Won “Best Hip-Hop Album’ at the AGE Music Victoria Awards 2016. The singles “The Crib” ft. Guilty Simpson & “Sliced Bread” ft Notes To Self BBRC received rotation on Triple J and Double J nationally.

Achievements

His album "Deep Above The Noise" won best Hip-Hop Album at the VIC Music Awards 2016. Attaining feature album status on Double J & 3PBS and Won “Best Hip-Hop Album’ at the AGE Music Victoria Awards 2016. The singles “The Crib” ft. Guilty Simpson & “Sliced Bread” ft Notes To Self BBRC received rotation on Triple J and Double J nationally.

Most recently nominated for "Engineer Of The Year" at the 2019 ARIA awards.

And won 2020 APRA Music Award “Most Performed Urban Work” with the “Leave Me Lonely” Hilltop Hoods.

He is a UK Mercury Prize Winner, (producing 2 singles for Speech Debelle's winning LP)

He produced Dialectrix’s 2013 album, “The Cold Light of Day” which was shortlisted for the Australian Music Prize, won the 2009 UK Mercury Prize for his work with Speech Debelle, and was nominated for ‘Best Urban Release’ at the 2008 ARIA Awards as half of the hip-hop duo Muph & Plutonic, who also placed 2 songs in the Triple J’s “Hottest 100” and landed the ‘Triple J Feature Album’ placements multiple times.

Production
Plutonic Lab has produced albums and EPs for many Australian hip hop artists on labels including Nuffsaid Records (collaborating over a number of years with Australian MC/producer Prowla) and Obese Records (including the label CEO Pegz).

He has also produced beats on releases from Shawn Lov (USA), MC Tumi (South Africa), Karma and Esoteric (USA), Eternia (Canada) and Taskforce (UK).

He has performed shows in Australia, North America, Europe and Asia. Opening for The Pharcyde, People Under The Stairs, Ozomatli, Mad Professor, Lee Scratch Perry, MC Supernatural, DJ Shadow, Money Mark, Hilltop Hoods, The Next Men, Mr Lif, Cage, Swollen Members, Braintax & Mystro, Lupe Fiasco, El-P, Tricky, The Streets and events including Cockatoo Island Festival, Obese Block Party, Pyramid Rock Festival, Falls Festival, Big Day Out, Groovin' the Moo, Golden Plains Festival, Splendour in the Grass and Good Vibrations Festival.

Plutonic Lab was voted 'Best Producer' three years running (2004, 2005, 2006) on Australian Hip- Hop community site ozhiphop.com.

All three Muph & Plutonic Albums & Pegz "Axis" LP obtained 'Feature Album' status on Australian national broadcaster Triple J.

His third LP "Codes Over Colours" was a featured album on Melbourne's 3RRR radio, and on other independent radio programs nationally.

In 2008 The Album "And Then Tomorrow Came" was nominated for an ARIA. The album also landed two songs in Triple J Hottest 100, 2009.

Speech Debelle's "Speech Therapy" LP won UK's Mercury Prize in 2009, for which Plutonic Lab produced two singles.

His music has also been featured in film and television including HBO's series Girls, TNT's series Franklin & Bash, and the feature films X, Noel Clarke's 4.3.2.1 and Chronicle.

He also produced Neon Heartache, the debut album of Jess Harlen, who was named best female artist in The Age'''s EG Awards in 2010.

Discography

Solo albums

Production

Albums

Singles and EPs

Tracks on other albums

Battle vinyl

Soundtracks

Awards and nominations
Music Victoria Awards
The Music Victoria Awards are an annual awards night celebrating Victorian music. They commenced in 2006.

! 
|-
| Music Victoria Awards of 2016
| Deep Above the Noise''
| Best Hip Hop Album
| 
|rowspan="1"| 
|-

References

External links
 Plutonic Lab official website
Plutonic Lab Discogs Page

Living people
1980s births
Australian record producers
Australian hip hop musicians
Australian drummers
Male drummers
Australian DJs
Musicians from Melbourne
RMIT University alumni
Obese Records artists
21st-century drummers
21st-century Australian male musicians
21st-century Australian musicians